The following is a list of notable Hazarewals (Northern Hindko linguistic-cultural group), who have origins in the Hazara Division.

 Abdul Jamil Khan 
 Abrar Ahmed Swati ( Cricketer) 
 Ali Azmat (Pakistani singer)
 Abdul Hakeem Swati ( Governor KPK )
Mushtaq Ghani ( Governor And Speaker KPK)
 Ali Khan Jadoon (MNA from Abbottabad)
 Reham Khan Swati ( BBC Journalist)
 Amanullah Khan Jadoon
 Saleh Muhammad Swati ( MNA from Mansehra) 
Sadiq Sayeed Khan (Former Federal Secretary Govt of Pakistan)
 Anwar Shamim (born; Haripur, Chief of Air Staff)
 Babar Saleem Swati ( MPA from Mansehra)
 Asghar Khan (Chief of Air staff)
 Ayub Khan (2nd President of Pakistan)
 Azam Khan Swati ( Senator and Federal Railway Minister)
 Baba Haider Zaman (founder of political party Tehreek i Suba Hazara)
 Waji Uz Zaman Khan ( Chief of Swati Tribe)
 Daud Kamal
 Gohar Ayub Khan (politician)
 Bashir Jahangiri Swati ( Chief Justice )
 Iqbal Khan Jadoon
 Mehtab Abbasi
 Jalal Baba
 Jasleen Dhamija
 Mohammed Naseer Khan (Pakistani Physicist)
 Murtaza Javed Abbasi (politician)
 Noman Bashir (Chief of Naval Staff)
 Omar Asghar Khan (founder of Qaumi Jamhoori Party and Ex Minister of Environment)
 Omar Ayub Khan (politician)
 Prem Nath Hoon (Retired Indian Army general)
 Salman Bashir
 Sana Mir (Captain Pakistan women's national team)
 Sardar Zahoor Ahmad (former MPA from Mansehra)
 Sardar Muhammad Raza (Chief Election Commissioner Pakistan and Chief justice Peshawar High Court)
 Sardar Muhammad Yousuf (former federal Minister of Religious Affairs)
 Zahirul Islam Abbasi (Pakistan Army Major General)

References 

Hindkowan people
Punjabi people
Indo-Aryan peoples
Ethnic groups in Pakistan
Hindkowan tribes